George Hecht (September 17, 1920 – October 24, 1994) was an American football guard. He played for the Chicago Rockets in 1947.

References

1920 births
1994 deaths
Players of American football from Chicago
American football guards
Alabama Crimson Tide football players
Chicago Rockets players